Dictionary Stories, by Jez Burrows, is a collection of stories built using sample sentences for words from the New Oxford American Dictionary. Originally shared on Tumblr, Dictionary Stories was released as a book by Harper Perennial in 2018.

References

External links
Dictionary Stories

2016 short story collections
British short story collections
HarperCollins books